The Package may refer to:

The Package (1989 film), starring Gene Hackman and Joanna Cassidy
The Package (2013 film), starring Steve Austin and Dolph Lundgren
The Package (2018 film), starring Daniel Doheny and Geraldine Viswanathan
"The Package" (short story), a 1952 short story by Kurt Vonnegut
"The Package" (Seinfeld), an episode of Seinfeld
"The Package" (Lost), an episode of Lost
The Package (TV series), a 2017 South Korean television series
 "The Package", a song from the album Thirteenth Step by A Perfect Circle
 El Paquete, another term for El Paquete Semanal (The Weekly Package), a Cuban collection of pirated media circulated in lieu of broadband Internet connections
 Jake Stringer, nicknamed "The Package", Australian rules footballer